Little Jerusalem Badlands State Park is a  state park in Logan County, Kansas, United States.

The park features  of Smoky Hill Chalk badlands with many narrow canyons in white rock likened to the walls and narrow winding streets of ancient Jerusalem. Little Jerusalem Badlands State Park is open year-round during daylight hours only. Visitors are not allowed off-trail unless accompanied by park staff on a guided tour.

See also

Nearby Smoky Hill Chalk natural monuments:
Castle Rock (Kansas)
Monument Rocks (Kansas)

References 

State parks of Kansas